Hajciunishki ( Khaydzhunishki) is a village in Belarus. It is known for a castellated house of Nonhart family, erected in the early 17th century.

Castles in Belarus
Populated places in Grodno Region